Banyan Tree AlUla is a luxury resort hotel located in Wadi Ashar, Al-'Ula, Saudi Arabia.

The hotel opened in October 2022, with Mariah Carey performing at its opening ceremony. It consists of 79 luxury tents in the desert. The resort features an infinity pool.

References

Hotels in Saudi Arabia
2022 establishments in Saudi Arabia
Hotels established in 2022